Oleksandr Anatoliiovych Dubinsky (born 18 April 1981) is a Ukrainian journalist, politician, blogger, presenter of "Money" TV show on 1 + 1 channel. He has been a People's Deputy of Ukraine since the 2019 Ukrainian parliamentary election elected for the party Servant of the People. He is the deputy chairman of the Verkhovna Rada Committee on Finance, Tax and Customs Policy. Many political observers consider him to be expressing the interests of an informal group of influence of Ukrainian businessman Ihor Kolomoisky. On 1 February 2021 Dubinsky was expelled from the Servant of the People parliamentary faction after the United States imposed sanctions for alleged interfering in the 2020 United States presidential election. On 15 March 2021 he was expelled from the party due to "violating the statute and disobeying the party's governing bodies."

Biography
Born on 18 April 1981 in Kyiv. According to Oleksandr Dubinsky himself, he studied at the 187th school in Kyiv, later on he graduated from three educational institutions: technical school, National University of Food Technologies, majoring in accounting and auditing, and the Kyiv Polytechnic Institute as an electrical engineer.

Journalistic and blogging activities
He worked at the Economic News newspaper ("Ekonomichni vidomosti" in Ukrainian) from 2004 to 2009, where he became known as an economic journalist.
From May 2009 to May 2010 he worked as Editor-in-Chief of Weekly.ua
Since 2009 he has been blogging on the Ukrayinska Pravda website. At some point, Ukrayinska Pravda's editorial staff began to warn that the journalist was biased. "Attention! The editorial board suspects that this author is performing some of his tasks. Keep this in mind when reading, " — stated in the description. Dubinsky's last blog post on Ukrayinska Pravda was published in mid-2015.
He became a creative producer for the Journalistic Investigations Department on 1 + 1 TV channel in 2010. In 2014, he was the host of the "Money" show. Since 2012, under the direction of Oleksandr Dubinsky, the program Ukrainsky Sensatsii (literally Ukrainian Scoops) has been launched on 1 + 1. According to the Servant of the People party, he is the creative producer of Ukrainsky Sensatsii and Secret Materials shows on 1 + 1.
In April 2017, he launched the personal blog site Dubinsky.Pro. Since May 2017, he has been actively blogging on YouTube.

Politics
As reported by Media Detector, when Oleksandr Dubinsky started working as the head of the Journalistic Investigations department in 2010, he became a clear and consistent advocate of the 1+1 channel's owner Ihor Kolomoisky. For instance, some productions of Ukrainsky Sensatsii have signs of political put-up job. Particularly, the production of 23 March 2019 called "50 Shades of Poroshenko" where then  President of Ukraine Petro Poroshenko was accused of creating a criminal group on the territory of Moldova and involvement in the murder of his brother Mykhailo.
Solomiia Vitvitska, a journalist at 1+1, called such investigations "strange" and assured that the TSN studio is not related to them. Oleksandr Dubinsky released a lot of critical materials about Poroshenko and only one about Yulia Tymoshenko. At the same time, he has his favourite – almost every Volodymyr Zelensky's public move is shown in a positive light. 
In the 2019 Ukrainian parliamentary election ran in constituency 94 located in Kyiv Oblast (Vasylkiv and Obukhiv cities, Vasylkiv and Obukhiv districts) representing the Servant of the People party. He hadn't been a member of any other political party before. Vidsich (Response) movement opposed Dubinsky within the Red Lines campaign. He won the election with 40.95% of the votes cast in his constituency and became a People's Deputy of the Verkhovna Rada of the 9th convocation. Member of the "Servant of the People" party.

Dubinsky headed the Servant of the People electoral list for deputies of the Kyiv Oblast Council in the 2020 Ukrainian local elections of 25 October 2020. Although the party won 22 seats he did not take up his mandate.

On 1 February 2021 Dubinsky was expelled from the Servant of the People (Verkhovna Rada) parliamentary faction after the United States imposed sanctions on him the previous month for alleged interfering in the 2020 United States presidential election. On 11 January 2021 the U.S. Department of the Treasury's Office of Foreign Assets Control put Dubinsky on its sanction list because he was claimed to be part of a "Russia-linked foreign influence network" associated with fellow People's Deputy Andrii Derkach. In May 2020, Derkach had released audio recordings that claim to disclose the influence of former U.S. Vice President Joe Biden on former (Ukrainian) President Petro Poroshenko. On 19 January 2021 the Prosecutor General of Ukraine's Office opened a criminal case against Dubinsky regarding the legalization of criminally obtained property and non-payment of taxes according to a statement filed by Ukraine's Anti-Corruption Action Center.

On 14 March 2021 Dubinsky was removed as chairman of the Servant of the People Kyiv regional organization. The next day he was expelled from the party due to "violating the statute and disobeying the party's governing bodies."

Honors
In 2007, 2008 and 2009 he was renowned as the best financial and economic journalist of Ukraine according to the results of the Business circles prize "PRESSZVANIE" contest. Oligarch Vadim Novinsky is one of the sponsors of the contest.
In 2008 he was the best bank journalist according to the National Bank of Ukraine.

Scandals

On 29 January 2019, representatives of the Petro Poroshenko Bloc gathered at the forum "From Kruty to Brussels. We are following our own way" which took place in Kyiv. Then Ukrainian president Petro Poroshenko announced his decision to run for a second term. After that, Dubinsky posted on Facebook about it: "Poroshenko's forum today was our chance. Chance to use gas. Just everyone was there". He deleted the post later, however, it has caused scandal. Thus, on 1 February, during the live broadcast of the talk show People Are Against It on ZIK TV channel, five guests were asked to leave Oleksandr Dubinsky's studio because of this post so they left the broadcast.

As stated in media reports, on 2 and 3 May 2019, Oleksandr Dubinsky's dubinsky.pro website posted the information on the introduction of a fee for placing electronic records on the MoH website about passing medical examinations, as well as budgetary funds for the training of health care workers, which were allegedly directed for a project implemented by the NGO "Patriot Protection". The MoH called these reports untrue, noting that Oleksandr Dubinsky used a fake document in his materials. 
Acting Health Minister Ulana Suprun filed a lawsuit against Oleksandr Dubinsky for the protection of honour, dignity and business reputation. On 8 November 2019, the Solomianskiy District Court of Kyiv dismissed Ulana Suprun's claim.

Media and primary sources point to a number of other cases where Oleksandr Dubinsky or his 1 + 1 projects disseminate fake or manipulative information.

In June 2019, a video in which Oleksandr Dubinsky says the motto "Glory to Ukraine!" is Nazi went viral, he also mentioned the legalization of this motto in the modern Ukrainian army is "absurd and lunatic".

In August 2019, shortly after being elected, Dubinsky justified the actions of Israeli Prime Minister Benjamin Netanyahu's wife Sara Netanyahu (she was throwing bread on the floor at Boryspil airport) saying in the past five years the former authorities had glorified Nazi collaborators.

On 17 June 2019, Oleksandr Dubinsky shared a photo of him on Facebook in the company of Andriy Portnov and Igor Guzhva. They're quite infamous in Ukraine.

In August 2019, Oleksandr Dubinsky supported the newly elected deputy Maxym Buzhansky, his colleague from the "Servant of the People", who called the journalist of "New Time" a "dopey cow".

On 11 November 2019, an investigation of "Nashi Hroshi" ("Our Money" in Ukrainian) about the property of the Dubinsky family was brought out on Bihus.Info. Investigators believe that the people's deputy refused to show his fortune immediately after the election because of the large number of cars and real estate he owns with his mother and wife. Dubinsky himself does not reject this information, but only indicates that all the property was purchased before he took the office.

After top managers of the National Bank of Ukraine (NBU) filed a lawsuit against Dubinsky to protect their business reputation, on 29 November 2019, he cussed out the management of NBU on social media and publicly accused past and present NBU leadership Valeria Hontareva, Yakiv Smolii and Kateryna Rozhkova of having committed crimes and wrongdoings.

Oleksandr Dubinsky called the foreign journalist a "stray animal" for photographing a meeting between Prime Minister Oleksiy Honcharuk and the head of President's Office Andriy Yermak in a restaurant in Kyiv. He expressed indignation at the work of the journalist in his post on his Facebook page where he called Radio Svoboda odious, empty and idle. 
Dubinsky also called the journalist and Radio Svoboda "dumb and deceitful.".

Oleksandr Dubinsky intimidated the director of the state-owned PrivatBank Petr Krumkhanzl (formerly owned by Kolomoyskyi) with Kolomoyskyi's words about the director allegedly being a member of the Waffen-SS, which he said at Dubilet's birthday, attended by Dubinsky.
And even after Petr Krumkhanzl was hospitalized with a suspected heart attack, Oleksandr Dubinsky continued to intimidate him: he posted on his Telegram channel that the disgruntled people were going to continue protesting at the hospital where Krumkhanzl was hospitalized. Dubinsky did not immediately respond to requests for commenting on the situation. He later added on his Telegram channel that he was not celebrating a heart attack, but simply saying that "Kolomoyskyi's toasts tend to come true."
Messages on Dubinsky's Telegram feed indicate that Kolomoyskyi and his supporters are in favor of returning PrivatBank by any means necessary. In his Telegram, trying to avoid responsibility, Dubinsky often refers to unknown sources when making statements and sharing information.

At the end of 2019, Oleksandr Dubinsky, who is said "leads the Kolomoyskyi's influence group in the Ukrainian parliament" and who, on assignment of the oligarch, "joined the public campaign ... aimed at shifting responsibility for interfering in the 2016 US elections from Russia to Ukraine" met with Rudy Giuliani, who was looking for compromising material on Joe Biden.

Oleksandr Dubinsky, as an announcer on Kolomoyskyi's 1 + 1 channel, shot a disgusting video after Kolomoyskyi's attempt of raider attack on the Ukrainian SkyUp low-cost airline carrier with the help of the Baryshivskyi District Court of Kyiv Oblast. There he said that low-cost airlines are "cattle cars" and expressed support for the decision against SkyUp.

On 7 April 2020, Dubinsky shared a screenshot (supposedly fake) on his Facebook page in which, on behalf of the Dnipro mayor Borys Filatov, it was promised to shoot pets that residents walk in parks during quarantine. Later on, Dubinsky placed another statement saying that Filatov removed his initial post about pets from his page and affronted the mayor. In comments section under the Dubinsky's post with insults, Filatov threatened Dubinsky using foul language with mutilations to be inflicted once they meet and literally said that Benia's (presumably Kolomoyskyi's) security staff won't save him. Moreover, Filatov published a post himself where he called (likely) Dubinsky a "Bearded Nana's (a local nickname for Kolomoyskyi) sidekick"

Bihus.Info reported on 2 October 2020 that a December 2013 Dubinsky news report about alleged prostitution on Maidan Nezalezhnosti "that served" Euromaidan demonstrators had been staged by Dubinsky at the request of and paid by then Minister of Revenue and Duties Oleksandr Klymenko. Dubinsky confirmed that he still used the email address that allegedly was used to coordinate the false reporting with Klymenko but denied the accusations.

Property
In November 2019, the media reported that Dubinsky owned 24 apartments and 17 cars. He refused to declare his property, explaining that he earned it before he became a deputy and that he made decent money as a journalist. He called the Bihus.Info investigation "a hit piece". In addition to apartments and cars, he also owns 70 acres of land and two houses. This property is valued at $2.5 million. According to Dubinsky himself, his salary on channel 1 + 1 was only ₴72,000. A part of the property is registered in his name, another part – in the name of his ex-wife Lesia Tsybko and his mother. Moreover, until 2016 the only official source of his mother's income was a pension. Much of the mother's property in the capital appeared in election year (2019).

Memes
"Mum likes the speed" — so explained Dubinsky that 7 cars, including Mercedes and Maserati, are registered in the name of his mother.

Family
Divorced from Lesia Tsybko.

References

External links 

Ukrainian journalists
Servant of the People (political party) politicians
Ninth convocation members of the Verkhovna Rada
1981 births
Ukrainian male writers
Living people
Politicians from Kyiv
Financial writers
Writers from Kyiv
Male journalists
Ukrainian television presenters
National University of Food Technologies alumni
Kyiv Polytechnic Institute alumni
Ukrainian Jews